Steven Allen Eddy (born August 21, 1957) is a retired professional baseball pitcher who played in one season for the California Angels of Major League Baseball.

References

1957 births
Living people
Major League Baseball pitchers
California Angels players
Baseball players from Illinois
People from Sterling, Illinois
Yale Bulldogs baseball players
El Paso Diablos players
Idaho Falls Angels players
Quad Cities Angels players
Salt Lake City Gulls players